Shart is a 1986 Bollywood crime thriller directed by Ketan Anand. The film stars Naseeruddin Shah, Shabana Azmi, Kanwaljit Singh, Sarika and Tom Alter.

Plot
When the city is rocked by a series of brutal murders of several prostitutes and a part of a photograph is the only clue, Inspector Arjun Dutt is assigned to crack the case. He is sure the murders have been committed by Vikram alias Devendra. But there is a sting in the tale as it is revealed that both Arjun and Vikram have been close friends and vying for the same woman, Kiran.

Cast
Naseeruddin Shah as Vikram / Devendra
Shabana Azmi as Kiran Dutt 
Kanwaljit Singh as Inspector Arjun Dutt
Sarika as Ruhi 
Tom Alter  
Trilok Kapoor
Mac Mohan as Jabbar (photographer) 
Dina Pathak as Jankibai 
Sonu Walia as Model

Soundtrack
All songs were penned by Kaifi Azmi while "Albela Albela" was written by Amit Khanna.

References

External links
 https://www.imdb.com/title/tt0363993/

1986 films
1980s Hindi-language films
Films scored by Bappi Lahiri